The POINT Intercity Bus Service is a four-route, intercity bus service of the Oregon Department of Transportation (ODOT). The service is administered by ODOT's Public Transportation Division as part of its intercity grant program. The POINT service exists to connect towns and rural communities with major transportation hubs and urban centers. ODOT accomplishes this by filling gaps in Oregon's long distance transit network where no public services exist and which would otherwise be unprofitable for private companies.

The service functions like a thruway bus service for Amtrak in that it makes direct connections to passenger rail service and sells tickets using Amtrak's system. However, Amtrak does not own or contract POINT buses and the service is open to the general public, not just Amtrak train passengers. The POINT program is similar to the Travel Washington buses in neighboring Washington.

History
ODOT began investing heavily in intercity bus services in 1994. The decline in Greyhound service in Oregon in the late 1990s led to a rise in local private operators. Over time, to better meet the travel needs of Oregonians and draw more ridership, ODOT created the POINT program through "a mixture of new service, expanded service and service re-branding that relies on public-private partnerships with private bus operators."  

The service is operated by private bus companies under contract to ODOT. MTR Western operates the Cascades and Eastern Routes, Northwest Navigator operates the NorthWest Route, and Pacific Crest Bus Lines operates the SouthWest Route.

In 2019, the former High Desert POINT route was discontinued and is now operated by Pacific Crest Bus Lines as an Amtrak Thruway Motorcoach service from Redmond to Klamath Falls.

Routes
 Cascades Route (established July 2012), operating from Portland (Union Station) to the University of Oregon (Eugene) with 5 stops in between
 Eastern Route (established February 2011), operating from Bend to Ontario with 9 stops in between
 NorthWest Route (established March 2010): Portland (Union Station) to Astoria with 7 stops in between
 SouthWest Route (established April 2009): Klamath Falls to Medford and Cave Junction to Brookings, with service in between Medford and Cave Junction provided by Josephine Community Transit

References

External links

Bus transportation in Oregon
Transit agencies in Oregon
Bus transportation in California
Intercity bus companies of the United States